Dixie Union may refer to:

 Dixie Union, Georgia, USA
 Dixie Union (horse) (1997–2010), thoroughbred horse bred on Lane's End Farm, fathered by Dixieland Band, and sired Dixie Commander and Hot Dixie Chick
 Dixie Union Chapel & Cemetery, built in 1837 in Dixie, Mississauga, Ontario, Canada
 Dixie Union, a small flexible film business based in Kempten, Germany that used to be part of Continental Can Company

See also
 Dixie (disambiguation)
 Union (disambiguation)